"I Told You So" is a song written and recorded by Australian country music artist Keith Urban. It was released in May 2007 as the third single from his 2006 album Love, Pain & the Whole Crazy Thing.  The song peaked at number 2 on the US Billboard Hot Country Songs chart and at number 48 on the Billboard Hot 100.

This song is used in the Rock Band Country Track Pack.

Content
"I Told You So" is a moderate-uptempo tune that talks about a man who has just met a lover with whom he recently split up. Upon encountering her, he begs for her to return, provided that she doesn't need to apologize for her own actions ("Please, just come back home / No, don't say that you're sorry / And I won't say 'I told you so'.").

Composition
The song features a Celtic influence, partially due to the use of Uilleann pipes. Snare drums are also used heavily throughout, most notably between the second chorus and the bridge. According to the album's liner notes, Urban plays several instruments in the song, including the electric guitar, the acoustic guitar, the ganjo, the bouzouki, the mandolin, the slide guitar, and some percussion. He also sings all of the vocals.

The radio edit features a shortened bridge, as well as a slightly truncated outro.

The song is set in the key of C# Minor. Each section has its own chord progression. The intro, verses, and outro have a progression of Cm-E-B-Fm. The pre-chorus has a chord progression of A-B/A-A-B-A. The chorus uses a chord progression of E-B-Fm-A-E-B-Fm-A. The bridge has the chord progression of Fminor-A-F-Cminor-Fminor-E/G-A. Urban’s vocals range from G3-C6.

Critical reception
Kevin John Coyne of Country Universe gave the song an A grade, saying that he "love[s] Urban's most recent album because he expands on his basic signature sound" and that it "doesn't hurt that the material is stronger" although the instrumental bridge is "like nothing [he's] ever heard before, on a country record or otherwise."

Personnel
As listed in liner notes.
Keith Urban – lead vocals, background vocals, lead electric guitar, acoustic guitar, ganjo, mandolin, bouzouki, slide guitar, percussion
Tom Bukovac – rhythm guitar
Eric Darken – percussion
Dann Huff – electric 12-string guitar, percussion
Chris McHugh – drums, percussion
Tim Lauer – accordion, synthesizer
Eric Rigler – tin whistle, Uilleann pipes
Jimmie Lee Sloas – bass guitar
Jonathan Yudkin – fiddle

Chart performance
"I Told You So" entered the U. S. Billboard Hot Country Songs chart at number 53 on the chart week of April 28, 2007. It debuted on the Billboard Hot 100 at number 94.

Year-end charts

Certifications

References

2007 singles
Keith Urban songs
Song recordings produced by Dann Huff
Songs written by Keith Urban
Capitol Records Nashville singles
2006 songs